"Albatross" is a guitar-based instrumental by Fleetwood Mac, released as a single in November 1968, later featuring on the compilation albums The Pious Bird of Good Omen (UK) and English Rose (US). The piece was composed by Peter Green.

Composition
Santo & Johnny's "Sleep Walk" (1959) reportedly inspired Peter Green for his 1968 instrumental "Albatross", although the composition also resembles Chuck Berry's 1957 instrumental "Deep Feeling", itself derivative of the 1939 recording "Floyd's Guitar Blues" by Andy Kirk and his 12 Clouds of Joy, featuring guitarist Floyd Smith. In Green's biography [Celmins 1998], an early inspiration for "Albatross" was said to have been "a group of notes from an Eric Clapton solo, played slower."

The composition and its arrangement suggest a relaxing sea setting, with cymbals imitating the sound of waves (Mick Fleetwood played his drum kit using timpani mallets to give a muted sound) and a dreamy solo from Green's guitar. It contains four chords, E, Emaj7 (or G#m/E), A/E, and F#m, played by Green on his Fender Stratocaster into a Matamp Series 2000. Green had been working on the piece for some time before the addition to the band of 18-year-old guitarist Danny Kirwan. Slide guitarist Jeremy Spencer was not generally inclined to work with Green, who had felt unable to realise the overall effect that he wanted. With Kirwan's input, Green completed the piece and it was recorded just two months after Kirwan joined, without Spencer present. Although he was not a part of the recording sessions, Spencer was shown in video material miming to Green's slide guitar parts. Kirwan's instrumental "Jigsaw Puzzle Blues" was chosen for the B-side in most territories. "Albatross" has been re-released many times as a single in various countries, with many different B-sides.

This composition is one of only a few tracks by the original line-up of Fleetwood Mac that is included on their later "greatest hits" and "best of" compilations.  "Albatross" is the only Fleetwood Mac composition with the distinction of having inspired a Beatles song, "Sun King" from 1969's Abbey Road.

Commercial performance
The song was a success in several countries and remains Fleetwood Mac's only number-one hit in the UK Singles Chart, spending one week at the top in January 1969.

"Albatross" was re-released in the United Kingdom in April 1973 as part of a CBS Records series entitled "Hall of Fame Hits", and enjoyed a second UK chart run, peaking at number 2.

As of 2019, "Albatross" has sold over 900,000 copies in the UK.

Personnel
Peter Green – guitar
Danny Kirwan – guitar
John McVie – bass guitar
Mick Fleetwood – drums

Charts

Certifications

Legacy
One of the earliest uses of the tune was on the soundtrack for the Rainer Werner Fassbinder sci-fi virtual reality film World on a Wire (1973). It was featured (along with "Jigsaw Puzzle Blues") in 1979's Rock 'n' Roll High School. Mick Fleetwood told Rolling Stone magazine that it was also used by the BBC on a wildlife program before it was a hit. The piece was also used as the background music to Marks & Spencer's 2005 advertising campaign. The song was used again by Marks & Spencer in 2019.

In March 2005, Q magazine placed "Albatross" at number 37 in its list of the "100 Greatest Guitar Tracks".

John Lennon was thought to be inspired by 'Albatross' to write the Beatles' song "Sun King" from their 1969 Abbey Road album.

References

1960s instrumentals
1968 songs
Fleetwood Mac songs
Rock instrumentals
UK Singles Chart number-one singles
Songs written by Peter Green (musician)
Song recordings produced by Mike Vernon (record producer)